Suite: April 2020 is a solo piano album by Brad Mehldau. It was recorded in 2020 and released later that year by Nonesuch Records.

Background
During the COVID-19 pandemic, Mehldau was at home in Amsterdam with his family. During that period, in April 2020, he wrote twelve pieces based on his experiences at that time. Bob Hurwitz, chairman emeritus of Nonesuch Records, encouraged the pianist to compose the music "designed to reflect the deep insecurities, comforting rituals and unexpected graces of the time". Mehldau himself describes the album as "a musical snapshot of life in the last month in the world in which we've all found ourselves."

Music and recording
For the album, three compositions by others were added to the twelve pieces by Mehldau. The album was recorded on April 23 and 24, 2020, at Power Sound Studios in Amsterdam. All of the pieces were performed solo on piano by Mehldau. No piece exceeds four minutes in length, in contrast with many of his previous more improvisation-based performances.

On the final piece, "Look for the Silver Lining", "Mehldau intentionally ends on the V chord, leaving the sound – and the situation – in an unresolved state."

Release and reception

Suite: April 2020 was released on limited-edition 180-gram vinyl and for download by Nonesuch Records on June 12, 2020. Nonesuch released the CD and standard vinyl editions on September 18 of the same year.

DownBeat wrote, "If its bite-size pieces are easily digestible, so are its penetrating melodies. Like the thinned-out harmonies, they emphasize the isolation at the heart of both the work and the context." JazzTimes described the 12-piece suite as "mostly muted, introspective music". Thomas Fletcher writing for Jazz Journal added, "As ever, Mehldau’s graceful touch continues to send me into deep reflection. The titles of each composition are named appropriately... Each homes in on individual thoughts and memories which are reflected the music." Chris Pearson of The Times observed, " Now Brad Mehldau re-emerges with the first Covid-themed solo jazz album. Is this wise? As the world gradually gropes its way back to normality we are perhaps realising why previous pandemics were forgotten: those who lived through them wanted it that way. Does this set already belong to the past? Perhaps not."

Track listing

Source:

Personnel
Brad Mehldau – piano

Chart performance

References

2020 albums
Brad Mehldau albums
Nonesuch Records albums
Solo piano jazz albums